German submarine U-550 was a Type IXC/40 German Navy U-boat built during World War II. She was laid down on 2 October 1942 by Deutsche Werft in Hamburg as yard number 371, launched on 12 May 1943 and commissioned on 28 July under the command of Kapitänleutnant Klaus Hänert.

Design
German Type IXC/40 submarines were slightly larger than the original Type IXCs. U-550 had a displacement of  when at the surface and  while submerged. She had two shafts and two  propellers.

U-550 was fitted with six  torpedo tubes (four fitted at the bow and two at the stern), 22 torpedoes, one  SK C/32 naval gun, 180 rounds, and a  SK C/30 as well as a  C/30 anti-aircraft gun. The boat had a complement of forty-eight.

Service history
After training with the 4th U-boat Flotilla, she was assigned to the 10th U-boat Flotilla on 1 February 1944 in Lorient in occupied France.

Patrol

She sailed from Kiel on 6 February 1944, heading for the North Atlantic, via the gap between Iceland and the Faroe Islands and conducted weather reporting duties before sailing for Newfoundland and subsequently the northeast coast of the United States. On 22 February the boat was unsuccessfully attacked south of Iceland by a Canso flying boat of No. 162 Squadron RCAF. However, two members of the U-boat's crew were killed.

Loss

On 16 April 1944, south of Nantucket Island, she located convoy CU 21, bound for Great Britain from New York City. The , one of the largest tankers in the world, was unwisely straggling behind the convoy; U-550 torpedoed her. The ship quickly caught fire and began to sink. As the vessel settled, the submerged U-boat maneuvered underneath her hull in an effort to hide from the inevitable counterattack by the convoy's escorts.

The escort division's flagship,  and  rescued the tanker's surviving crew, while the Joyce detected the U-boat on sonar as the Germans attempted to escape after hiding beneath the sinking tanker. U-550s engineering officer later said, "We waited for your ship to leave; soon we could hear nothing so we thought the escort vessels had gone; but as soon as we started to move – bang!" The Joyce delivered a depth-charge pattern that bracketed the submerged submarine. The depth charges were so well placed, a German reported, that one actually bounced off the U-boat's deck before it exploded.

According to eyewitness accounts cited in Randall Peffer's book Where Divers Dare: The Hunt for the Last U-boat, the attack severely damaged U-550 and forced it to the surface. Joyce, Peterson and Gandy circled around the submarine, firing at it. Gandy rammed U-550 abaft the conning tower and Peterson dropped two depth charges which exploded near the U-boat's hull. Two men in the U-boat's tower were killed.

Meanwhile, the U-boat captain Klaus Hänert tried to reach the observation deck with a surrender flag, but he was wounded by the American shells and fell back down into the U-boat's control room. Eventually, someone aboard the submarine fired a white flare from the tower hatch.

The captain of the USS Joyce, Robert Wilcox, took the flare as a sign of distress and surrender and called a cease fire. USS Gandy and USS Peterson ceased firing, too. The U-boat's crew scrambled on deck to abandon their sinking vessel. About 40 of the Germans entered the 44-degree water and tried to swim to USS Peterson, but the men were not picked up. Joyce rescued 13 of U-550s crew, including the captain Klaus Hänert, engineer Hugo Renzmann and doctor Friedrich Torge. One of the saved German seamen later died from wounds received during the firefight. Joyce delivered the prisoners of war as well as the Pan Pennsylvania survivors to the authorities in Ireland.

Men in the Water

There is a grisly postscript to the sinking of U-550. According to the Eastern Sea Frontier's War Diary account of the sinking.

The body was clothed in a German-type life jacket. From the markings on his clothing it was possible that the man's name was "Zube". A German escape lung was found near his body as well. An autopsy performed on the body indicated that the individual died only five days before his remains were discovered – U-550 had been sunk on 16 April, the corpse was found 19 days later.

Two other bodies were subsequently found. The first, picked up by another picket boat, CGR-1989, at 17:30 on 11 May, was fully clothed, had an escape lung and life jacket on. He was found in a rubber raft. Identification marks indicated the man was a German sailor named Wilhelm Flade, aged about 17. The body was transferred from CGR-1989 to CGR-1338 on the morning of 12 May 1944 and was brought to Tompkinsville on Staten Island.

On 16 May a third body was sighted and picked up by USS SC-630. It was stated that the uniform and insignia indicated the victim had been a German crewman, although he carried no identification; he had been in the water more than 18 days.

Discovery

The wreck of U-550 was discovered on 23 July 2012. A team of six divers, led by Joe Mazraani, located the wreck using side-scan sonar after a multi-year search.

Subsequent to the discovery, the divers received emails, letters and phone calls from veterans and the families of veterans involved in the battle who were looking for closure and hoping to set the record straight. The divers interviewed living veterans of the tanker Pan Pennsylvania and the US destroyer escorts. Eventually, the divers traveled to Germany and met with two of the last living survivors of U-550 as well as the families of the submarine's captain and doctor. What the divers learned was that the survivors of U-550 had become friends following the war with the captain of the Joyce, Robert Wilcox, who saved their lives.

They recovered a breakfast plate from the wreck and presented it to the ship's chief radio officer Mort Raphelson on the 70th anniversary of the battle. The plate resembled the one Raphelson had been eating from when the U-boat's torpedo hit his ship.

Summary of raiding history

References

Bibliography

External links

 (Please go to the line "U-Bootnr.:" and enter the figure 550. Then scroll down and click the "suchen" button to get a 2-page crew list. Table headers are in German but the data is in English.)

German Type IX submarines
World War II submarines of Germany
Shipwrecks of the Massachusetts coast
U-boats commissioned in 1943
U-boats sunk by depth charges
U-boats sunk by US warships
U-boats sunk in 1944
World War II shipwrecks in the Atlantic Ocean
1943 ships
Ships built in Hamburg
Maritime incidents in April 1944